Estadio Nacional Julio Martínez Prádanos (originally known as Estadio Nacional) is the national stadium of Chile, and is located in the Ñuñoa district of Santiago. It is the largest stadium in Chile with an official capacity of 48,665. It is part of a 62 hectare sporting complex which also features tennis courts, an aquatics center, a modern gymnasium, a velodrome, a BMX circuit, and an assistant ground/warmup athletics track.

Construction began in February 1937 and the stadium was inaugurated on December 3, 1938. The architecture was based on the Olympiastadion in Berlin, Germany. The stadium was one of the venues for the FIFA World Cup in 1962, and hosted the final where Brazil defeated Czechoslovakia 3–1. In 1948, the stadium hosted the matches of the South American Championship of Champions, the competition that inspired the creation of the UEFA Champions League and of the Copa Libertadores. The stadium was notoriously used as a mass imprisonment, torture, and extrajudicial execution facility by the Pinochet dictatorship following the 1973 military coup.

In 2009, a complete modernization plan was unveiled for the stadium and surrounding facilities. President Michelle Bachelet said it would become the most modern stadium in South America. The stadium was the opening and closing ceremonies, athletics, and football venue for the 2014 South American Games, and will repeat the honors for the 2023 Pan American Games.

History
The stadium was built on former farmland, donated in 1918 by farmer Jose Domingo Cañas.  The first sporting event in the new stadium took place on 3 December 1938, with a friendly game between the Chilean club Colo-Colo and Brazilian club São Cristóvão.  Colo-Colo won 6–3.

It has hosted all matches of the 1941, 1945 and 1955 South American Football Championships, and several matches of the 1991 and 2015 Copa América.

The stadium hosted the final stages of the 1959 World Basketball Championship.  It was held outdoors because the intended venue, the Metropolitan Indoor Stadium, was not ready in time.

In the early 1960s, under the government of Jorge Alessandri, the stadium was expanded to host the 1962 FIFA World Cup. The main change was that the velodrome that surrounded the stadium was replaced by galleries, thereby increasing its original capacity to around 95,000.

The stadium hosted group stage games between Italy, West Germany, Switzerland and Chile, including a notoriously ill-tempered and violent clash between Italy and Chile which became known as the Battle of Santiago.  Also held at the ground were a quarter-final, a semi-final, the third place play-off, and the final, in which Brazil was crowned world champions for the second time.  In the third-place play-off, Chile defeated Yugoslavia 1–0, marking the team's greatest success in international football.

Today, the ground serves as the home field for both the national team and the first-division club Universidad de Chile. It also hosts non-sporting events, such as political celebrations, charity events and concerts.

The stadium has been used since 1995 as the final leg of the Telethon with Don Francisco, a 28-hour telecast. The stadium holds up to 100,000 people for this annual event with the Jumbotron showing the required amount to reach the goal and its current donation. Exceptions were in 2014 and 2020; the first one was canceled due to bad weather conditions and the second due to the protection after the social outbreak.

On July 5, 2008, the stadium was officially renamed Estadio Nacional Julio Martínez Prádanos, in honor of a recently deceased sports journalist.

Use as a detention center

After the coup d'état of September 11, 1973, that ousted President Salvador Allende, the stadium began to be used as a detention facility. An article in the Harvard Review of Latin America reported that "there were over 80 detention centers in Santiago alone" and gave details of the National Stadium and others.

Over 40,000 people spent time in the compound during the junta regime. Twelve thousand detainees were interned between September 11 and November 7. The field and gallery were used to hold men, while women were held in the swimming pool changing rooms and associated buildings. Locker rooms and corridors were all used as prison facilities while interrogations were carried out in the velodrome. The Red Cross estimated that 7,000 prisoners occupied the stadium at one point, of whom about 300 were foreigners. According to the testimonies of survivors collected by the humanitarian group, detainees were tortured and threatened with death by shooting. Some were actually shot or taken to unknown locations for execution. Pinochet and other members of the junta would often take turns hollering and swearing at the detainees over the stadium's public address system.

FIFA President Sir Stanley Rous insisted the USSR team play a World Cup qualifier at the time. They however refused to do so and Chile qualified automatically for the 1974 World Cup, where they failed to advance from a group containing both West and East Germany and Australia.

The use of the stadium during the coup d'état is depicted in the 2002 documentary film Estadio Nacional, directed and produced by Carmen Luz Parot, and in the 2007 Swedish film The Black Pimpernel, which is based on the story of Swedish ambassador in Chile Harald Edelstam and his heroic actions to protect the lives of over 1,200 people during and after the military coup. The Black Pimpernel was shot on location in Santiago. The 1982 film Missing by Greek filmmaker Costa-Gavras depicts the September 11, 1973 coup d'état and execution of American journalists Charles Horman and Frank Teruggi at the Estadio Nacional.

In 2011, Chile set aside a section of the stadium, a section of old wooden bleachers called "Escotilla 8", to honor the prisoners who were detained there. It is surrounded by a barbed wire fence.

2009–2010 renovation

On June 15, 2009, President Michelle Bachelet announced several infrastructure improvements in order to modernize the stadium and its immediate facilities. Out of the total 24 billion pesos (US$42.3 million) contemplated in the plan, 20 billion pesos (US$35.3 million) are destined to bring the stadium up to modern standards. The changes include, a roof covering all the seats, which will also provide illumination; installation of seats around the entire stadium, lowering the current capacity to 47,000; a new state-of-the-art scoreboard; a 2.5 m deep 2 m wide pit will separate the track and the spectators to replace the fence; and several other changes. Because the stadium is a national monument the façade will remain the same, with the roof structure placed on top, without modifying the exterior. The stadium was closed on August 15, 2009. The stadium was scheduled to be reinaugurated in March 2010 to stage a double friendly match between Chile and North Korea and Panama, but the works were not finished on time. The construction of the roof has since been postponed by the government of President Sebastián Piñera due to financial constraints brought about by the February 27, 2010 earthquake. Although the stadium suffered minor damage from the earthquake, it partially opened to host the match between C.F. Universidad de Chile and C.D. Guadalajara for Copa Libertadores 2010. It was officially re-inaugurated on September 12, 2010, during Chile's bicentennial festivities.

2014 South American Games renovation
On September 12, 2010, during the Chilean bicentennial festivities, President Sebastián Piñera announced that the capacity of the stadium will be increased so as to reach 70,000 seats for the 2014 South American Games that will take place in Santiago. The works are expected to begin in 2012.

On June 3, 2011, further renovation plans were announced by the government. The complete area surrounding the stadium will be turned into a park to be called "Citizenry Park" (Parque de la Ciudadanía). Over 70% of the new 64-hectare park will consist of green areas, and the rest will include new infrastructure such as a lagoon or restaurants. The new park is expected to be ready for the 2014 games. New sporting venues will be built for the 2014 games, such as two modern gymnasiums, a new heated pool for synchronized swimming, a renovated velodrome and an expanded CAR, which will also serve as residence of the future Ministry of Sports. The only venues that will remain are the stadium, the main tennis court, the velodrome, the CAR, the athletics track, the skating track, the hockey field and the caracolas.

Attendances

The highest attendance for a match at Estadio Nacional to date is 85,268, for a Primera Division match played on December 29, 1962; Universidad de Chile defeated Universidad Catolica 4–1. In the 2016–17 season, Universidad de Chile drew an average home league attendance of 30,041 for the Apertura and 33,466 for the Clausura.

1962 FIFA World Cup
Estadio Nacional hosted ten games of the 1962 FIFA World Cup, including the final matches.

Concerts
The stadium hosts many international and national concerts during the year. In 1977, Spanish singer Julio Iglesias performed in the stadium. Years later, in 1989, Rod Stewart performed what is considered the first proper rock concert  by an international artist in the venue, drawing more than 80,000 fans. The show was broadcast throughout the country. After that, the city started being included in many tours from international artists, using several facilities from the Stadium park. In 2001, Chilean band Los Prisioneros became the first act to perform two consecutive days in the stadium, while Madonna is considered the first international artist to achieve the same in 2008. In 2022, Puerto Rican star Daddy Yankee became the first act to sell out three concerts in the venue on a single day, while British band Coldplay became the first act to schedule three and four consecutive concerts as part of the same tour.

Recordings of concerts at the stadium have been commercially released. The show of Cuban folk singer Silvio Rodríguez in March 1990 was released on a 2CD set titled Silvio Rodríguez en Chile, while both concerts of Los Prisioneros in late 2001 were released on cassette and CD as Estadio Nacional, and on VHS and DVD as Lo Estamos Pasando Muy Bien. English heavy metal band Iron Maiden recorded their show in the venue during The Final Frontier World Tour in April 2011. The show was released on CD, LP, DVD and Blu-ray as En Vivo! in March 2012.

The following is a list of concerts, showing date, artist or band, tour, opening acts and attendance.

Capacity 
The stadium was built with an original capacity of 48,000 spectators in 1937. At the time, some considered it a "white elephant" because it was thought that it could never be filled. The term also alluded to the charges of corruption against the administration of Arturo Alessandri, which oversaw the stadium's costly construction.

For the 1962 FIFA World Cup, seating capacity was increased to 74,000 with overflow areas allowing for a total of more than 80,000 people, by eliminating the cycling track that was moved to another location. Over the years, seating capacity was reduced to keep escape routes clear and prevent accidents.

For the 2000 World Junior Championships in Athletics, the installation of individual seats was required, which reduced capacity to 66,000 spectators. This requirement ensured that the stadium could not exceed capacity, as seen with the visit of Pope John Paul II in 1987 (believed to be attended by more than 90,000 people, though no accurate measurement could be taken as attendance was free, with no control), or the closing of the Telethon. The official capacity of the stadium as of 2014 is 48,665.

References

External links

Football Temples of the World-Chile
World Stadium Article 
Stadium Guide Article

Nacional (Chile)
1973 in Chile
1962 FIFA World Cup stadiums
1976 Davis Cup
Na
Nacional (Chile)
Internment camps
Nacional (Chile)
Nacional (Chile)
Chile
Nacional (Chile)
National Monuments of Chile
Event venues established in 1938
Sports venues completed in 1938
1938 establishments in Chile
Venues of the 2023 Pan and Parapan American Games